Thank You Brother is a 2021 Indian Telugu-language thriller film written and directed by Ramesh Raparthi. Produced by Magunta Sarath Chandra Reddy and  Tharaknath Bommi Reddy, the film stars Anasuya Bharadwaj and Viraj Ashwin in primary roles. The film premiered on Aha on 7 May 2021. Music of the film is composed by Guna Balasubramanian. The film is an official remake of the 2019 Nigerian film Elevator Baby.

Plot 
 
The story revolves around the lives of two people - Priya, who is a pregnant widow after her husband Surya dies in a factory accident and Abhi, a young man who has illicit sex with other girls who exploits his mother's money with parties, who later argues with his mother who blocks his credit card to teach him a lesson and leaves the house with anger. Abhi later tries to get a job by attending many interviews only to get unemployed due to COVID-19. He lives in the same apartment where Priya lives. Once, when Priya and Abhi are traveling on the elevator, it gets stuck and then crashes down to the basement. He tries to get help from his friends only to be rejected due to an argument. All of the apartment residents came to know about this and try to help them. One of them broadcast the situation on all television channels. The friends try to help them now. Priya goes into labor. Abhi's father Dr. Prem helps him to assist her birth. At last, Priya's baby girl is born and the electrician helped them by making the elevator work. Everyone accepts Abhi as a changed man.

Cast 

 Anasuya Bharadwaj as Priya
 Viraj Ashwin as Abhi
 Mounika Reddy as Sameera
 Anish Kuruvilla as Dr. Prem
 Harsha Chemudu as Chiku
 Annapoorna
 Archana Ananth as Bhanu
 Aadarsh Balakrishna as Surya
 Kadambari Kiran
 Viva Raghav
Sajiv Pasala

Production 
Viraj Ashwin and debutant Mounika Reddy were cast for main roles in the film. Filming was done in late 2020. A promotional poster was released in November 2020, revealing the title of the film.

Soundtrack 
The lyrical version of the first single "The Soul of Thank You Brother" was released on 28 April 2021 on Aditya Music label.

Marketing and release 
The film was originally scheduled for a theatrical release on 30 April 2021. Due to the COVID-19 pandemic, the film was scheduled to release on Aha on 7 May 2021.

Reception 
The film received mixed reviews from critics. Sravan Vanaparthy of The Times of India wrote that "there are more misses than hits and as a viewer, you're left yearning for more." Another critic of Cinema Express quoted "Thank You Brother is a better drama than a thriller." A reviewer of India Today rated the film 2 out of 5 and stated that the film is yet another OTT film that is cliched and predictable and also said that the film's story does not offer anything new.

The Hindu's Sangeetha Devi Dundoo wrote, "Despite the predictability of how things will unravel, I kept watching in the hope that Priya is safe and Abhi rises to the occasion and helps her," and compared the film with the 2019 Nigerian film Elevator Baby.

References

External links 

 
 Thank You Brother on Aha

2021 films
Aha (streaming service) original films
2020s Telugu-language films
2021 thriller films
Indian thriller films
Films set in Hyderabad, India
Films shot in Hyderabad, India
Direct-to-video thriller films